Gerald Bartley (12 June 1898 – 18 April 1975) was an Irish Fianna Fáil politician who served as Minister for the Gaeltacht and Minister for Defence from 1959 to 1965. He was a TD for the Galway and Galway West constituencies from 1932 until his retirement in 1965.

Bartley was born in Cloghan, County Mayo. He was the son of RIC Sergeant John Bartley and Anne Costelloe, a grocer. His family later settled in Clifden, County Galway. He was educated at O'Connell Schools in Dublin and joined the Irish Volunteers in 1914. He eventually became vice-brigadier of the Connemara Brigade of the Irish Republican Army, served with a flying column during the War of Independence and was interned during the Civil War. In 1925 Bartley was elected to Galway County Council and served as chairman of the finance committee before his election to Dáil Éireann.

For almost twenty years Bartley remained as a backbench TD before his first government appointment as Parliamentary Secretary to the Minister for Agriculture in 1951. On returning to government in 1957, Bartley was appointed Parliamentary Secretary to the Minister for Industry and Commerce. He was moved to the position of Parliamentary Secretary to the Minister for Finance the following year before joining the cabinet as Minister for the Gaeltacht in 1959. Two years later Bartley became Minister for Defence, a post he held until his retirement from politics in 1965.

References 

 

Politicians from County Galway
Fianna Fáil TDs
1898 births
1975 deaths
Members of the 7th Dáil
Members of the 8th Dáil
Members of the 9th Dáil
Members of the 10th Dáil
Members of the 11th Dáil
Members of the 12th Dáil
Members of the 13th Dáil
Members of the 14th Dáil
Members of the 15th Dáil
Members of the 16th Dáil
Members of the 17th Dáil
Ministers for Defence (Ireland)
Parliamentary Secretaries of the 16th Dáil
Parliamentary Secretaries of the 14th Dáil